Kolathur block  is a revenue block of Salem district of the Indian state of Tamil Nadu. This revenue block consist of 14 panchayat villages. They are,
 Alamarathupatti
 Chithiraipattipudur
 Dhinnapatti
 Kannamoochi
 Karungallur
 Kaveripuram
 Kolnaickenpatti
 Lakkampatti
 Moolakkadu
 Navapatti
 Palamalai
 Pannavadi
 Sampalli
 Singiripatti

References 

Revenue blocks of Salem district